Romulus Senior High School or Romulus High School is the public high school in the city of Romulus, Michigan in Metro Detroit.

History

In 2013 Inkster High School closed due to the closure of the Inkster School District. Students in the Inkster zone south of Michigan Avenue and west of Middlebelt were rezoned to Romulus High School. This area includes portions of Inkster and Westland.

Demographics
The demographic breakdown of the 892 students enrolled in 2016-2017 was:
Male - 54.1%
Female - 45.9%
Black - 77.3%
Hispanic - 4.0%
White - 17.6%
Multiracial - 1.1%

70.3% of the students were eligible for free or reduced-cost lunch.

Athletics 
The following sports are offered at RHS.  Unless noted there are teams for both sexes:

Baseball (boys)
Basketball
Boys state champion - 1986, 2013
Bowling
Cross Country
Competitive Cheerleading (girls)
Football (boys)
Golf (boys)
Soccer
Softball (girls)
Tennis (girls)
Track & Field
Boys state champion - 2000
Girls state champion - 2009
Volleyball (girls)
Wrestling (boys)

The Romulus High School Eagles has a longtime rivalry with the Belleville High School Tigers.

Notable people
 Wes Clark, professional basketball player
 Kris Clyburn, professional basketball player, Israeli Premier League
 Will Clyburn, professional basketball player, 2016 top scorer in the Israel Basketball Premier League, 2019 EuroLeague Final Four MVP
 Shaler Halimon, professional basketball player
 Charlie Henry, former assistant basketball coach at Romulus, college and professional basketball coach. 
 John Holifield, professional football player
 Robert Lambert, Daytime Emmy Award winning casting director for Days of Our Lives.
 Charley Lau, professional baseball player and coach
 Grant Long, professional basketball player
 John Long, professional basketball player
 Terry Mills, professional basketball player
 Nate Oats, former head basketball coach and teacher at Romulus, current head basketball coach at University of Alabama.

References

External links

 Romulus H.S. Website
 School district website

Public high schools in Michigan
Educational institutions established in 1916
Schools in Wayne County, Michigan
1916 establishments in Michigan
Romulus, Michigan